Siglinde Kallnbach (born in 1956 in Tann, Hesse) is an internationally active German artist. Her work includes performance art, installation art, multimedia art, photography, and art intervention.

Biography 
From 1976 to 1983, Kallnbach studied at the Hochschule für bildende Künste in Kassel and attended the classes of Harry Kramer, Karl Oskar Blase, Georg Bussmann and Heiner Georgsdorf. She received a scholarship by the Evangelische Studienwerk Villigst. In 1977, Kallnbach spent an academic year in Auckland. In 1983, she graduated in fine arts, partly with the performance Examensperformance L(e)ine, and passed her Staatsexamen (Teacher Certificate Examination) in art education and English studies. Since that time, she has pursued her career as an international artist. In 1985, she was awarded a prize by the Robert Bosch Stiftung. Several trips led her to Oceania and South-East Asia in order to study, exhibit her work, or do art projects. Kallnbach held teaching positions at the Musahi University Tokyo, at the WAKO University Tokyo, at the Fachhochschule Bochum and the Kunstakademie Bad Reichenhall.  In 2002, she finished training for multi-media design. Siglinde Kallnbach lives and works in Cologne.

Life and work 
Since the end of the 1970s, Siglinde Kallnbach deals with socially and politically relevant subjects in her performances and interventions such as discrimination, racism, war, and injustice. Through her frequent travels, she is concerned with transcultural aspects, e.g. basic human needs and rituals, which she cross-culturally compares to facilitate dialogue beyond cultural borders. In doing so, using her own body as an instrument of physical perception is of central relevance. Until today, Siglinde Kallnbach realizes the impact of social conditions and predicaments through her own body. In her early work, this often implied carrying herself to physical extremes.
Kallnbach comprehensively includes photography, various objects and materials in her performances and installations and conveys complex cultural meanings by her highly symbolic acts. These do not only refer to an individually defined myth, but transfer her very own existential experience into a wider social context. Moreover, an important aspect of her artistic work is the active involvement of others. For example, in the second part of her Trilogy Kleinsassen (1985), she was able to unite 360 participations from 39 countries in her exhibition. For her project Wunschspur-Wishingtrack (1999–2001), she collected more than 4000 wishes for the future from all over the world and transformed them into a 460 m abstract track, which she presented in a maintenance tunnel underneath the Rhine on New Year's Eve 2000 and 2001. 
Siglinde Kallnbach's artistic work is closely related to life and the everyday. Since she was diagnosed with cancer for the first time in 2000, she started to address the disease and its impact also in her art, while she places the individual suffering into a wider social context. With her interactive project a performancelife (since 2001) that serves to express empathy with cancer patients, Kallnbach creates options to release creative energy so as to convey its transformative power for the benefit of patients, their relatives, and the medical staff. For her social commitment, she was called she who loves fire in Japan as early as the 1980s.

Solo performances and solo exhibitions (selection) 
1978 first performances in New Zealand and Australia
1984–86 process art trilogy (Feuertor etc.), Kleinsassen/Hessen
1987 Judicium Ignis – 500 Jahre Hexenhammer, Exhibition at the Hochschulgalerie Kausch and women's procession, Kassel
1990 When will Mr. Saito buy van Gogh's ear?, performance, installation and documentation, Heineken Village Gallery, Tokyo
1992 Ei des Phönix, three performances, Theater im Fridericianum, Kassel
1993 Fremdenfreude II, performance and installation, Schaufenstergalerie Kassel
1994 Die Rose von Jericho, performance festival, Oldenburg
1997 Rheinspur, art intervention, GEW Tunnel underneath the Rhine, exhibition Rheinspur/performance taubenrot, Antoniterkirche Cologne
2000 Wunschspur, exhibition, Vonderau Museum Fulda
since 2001 art project a performancelife
2002 Van Gogh's Dream, performance, Aomori Contemporary Art Center, Aomori/Japan
2005 Rheingold – Shinkansen, exhibition, Kita Gallery, Yamatokooriyama-City / Nara-Ken
2007 HC – BC, exhibition and performance, KunstWerk Köln
2008/09 Ludwig Forum for International Art, Aachen

Works in public collections 
 Art Collection Deutsche Bank
 Kölnisches Stadtmuseum
 Vonderau Museum Fulda
 Stadtmuseum Siegburg
 Stadt Kölnischer Kunstbesitz
 Muzej i galerija Ijentnikovca Buca/Centar za kulturu Tivat
 Staatliche Kunstsammlungen – Neue Galerie Kassel
 documenta Archiv Kassel
 Kunststation Kleinsassen
 Stadtsparkasse Wuppertal

Solo exhibitions (selection) 
Rheingold – Shinkansen, Salon Verlag Köln, 2007, 
Wunschspur – Wishingtrack, Salon Verlag Köln, 2002, 
Rheinspur, Salon Verlag Köln 1999, 
Siglinde Kallnbach – Performance, dalebo Verlag, Köln 1995, 
Siglinde Kallnbach: Todesmasken für van Gogh/Japan 1990, Kunststation Kleinsassen 1991
Verbindungen, Kunststation Kleinsassen 1985
Feuertor, Kunststation Kleinsassen 1984

Group exhibitions (selection) 
Alles Prophetinnen, Frauenmuseum Bonn, 2006, 
Performa 04 – FestiwalSztukj Zywej/Live Art Festival – Private Impact, Szczecin/Polen, 2004
Kunst auf Rezept, Salon Verlag Köln 2001, Museum Ratingen 2001 und andere Orte, 2002/2003, 
Shozo Shimamoto – Siglinde Kallnbach, Japanisches Kulturinstitut Köln, Köln 2000
Gabriele Münter Preis 1997, Frauen Museum Bonn/Kunsthalle Dominikanerkirche Osnabrück/Galerie am *Fischmarkt Erfurt, 
Stadt der Frauen, Frauenmuseum Bonn 1995
Multimedialistinnen: Performerinnen-Woche Erfurt, Kunsthaus Erfurt 1992
InterAzioni- Laboratorio Internationale delle Performances et Installazioni, Cagliari/Sardinien 1990

Publications (selection)
Siglinde Kallnbach: "Performance – der perforierte Begriff – ein Plädoyer gegen die Lehrbarkeit von Performance", in: Marie-Luise Lange (Hrsg.): Performativität erfahren. Aktionskunst lehren – Aktionskunst lernen. Schibri Verlag, Berlin/Milow/Strasburg, 2006, 
Siglinde Kallnbach: "Judicium Ignis: 500 Jahre Hexenhammer – Frauenprozession durch die Kasseler Innenstadt", in: Feministische Kulturpädagogik: Projekte und Konzepte, Akademie Remscheid 1989,

Bibliography 
James Putnam: Art and Artifact. – The Museum As Medium, Thames & Hudson, London 2001, 
20 Jahre Frauenmuseum Bonn, Bonn 2001, 
Religion betrifft uns: Friedrich Spee, Verlag Bergmoser und Höller, ISSN 0936-5141, Aachen 1996
Thomas Illmaier: "Siglinde Kallnbach: Schamanistische Performance", in: Yearbook for Ethnomedicine and the Study of Consciousness, no. 4, Verlag für Wissenschaft und Bildung Berlin 1995, 
"Tempelopfer und Feuerrituale", in: KUNSTFORUM International, Band 130/1995
"EL Interview Siglinde Kallnbach", in: The English Journal, Tokio, März 1992 (mit Audio-Kassette)
Elisabeth Jappe: Performance Ritual Prozeß – Handbuch der Aktionskunst in Europa, Prestel-Verlag, München/New York 1993,

External links

References 
 

1956 births
Living people
People from Fulda (district)
German installation artists
Photographers from Hesse
German performance artists